WASR (1420 kHz) is a commercial AM radio station broadcasting a classic hits format, with Jack Heath's "Good Morning NH" from WTPL-Binnie Media, Concord.  WASR is licensed to Wolfeboro, New Hampshire, and serves the New Hampshire Lakes Region. The station is owned by Winnipesaukee Radio Station, LLC and runs local programming with national news  and Weather. In February 2020 new station manager Eric Scott changed the format to variety hits with some local talk including a live call in show at noon, a local sports show on Friday afternoons, and a live Catholic Mass Sunday mornings.

At one time, WASR was an adult standards station, carrying Citadel Media's Timeless service. It also tried conservative talk with little success. The station switched to the current format on February 24, 2020.

WASR is also heard on a 250-watt FM translator, 97.1 W246DI.

References

External links

ASR (AM)
Classic hits radio stations in the United States
News and talk radio stations in the United States
Carroll County, New Hampshire
Radio stations established in 1970
1970 establishments in New Hampshire